Stanislav Svoboda (9 October 1930 – 4 May 1967) was a Czech cyclist. He competed in the individual and team road race events at the 1952 Summer Olympics.

References

External links
 

1930 births
1967 deaths
Czechoslovak male cyclists
Olympic cyclists of Czechoslovakia
Cyclists at the 1952 Summer Olympics
Czech male cyclists